The term Armengol government may refer to:

First government of Francina Armengol, the government of the Balearic Islands under Francina Armengol from 2015 to 2019.
Second government of Francina Armengol, the government of the Balearic Islands under Francina Armengol from 2019.